Russell Shoemaker Ohl (January 30, 1898 – March 20, 1987) was an American scientist who is generally recognized for patenting the modern solar cell ("Light sensitive device").
Ohl was a notable semiconductor researcher prior to the invention of the transistor. He was also known as R.S. Ohl.

Russell Ohl’s specialized area of research was into the behavior of certain types of crystals. He worked on materials research in the 1930s at AT&T's Bell Labs’ Holmdel facility, investigating diode detectors suitable for high-frequency wireless, broadcasting, and military radar. His work was only understood by a handful of scientists in the organization, one of whom was Dr. Walter Brattain (one of the trio who invented the germanium bipolar transistor in 1947, and who would be awarded the Nobel Prize for Physics in 1956).

Ohl, in 1939, discovered the PN barrier (or as it became known, the “P–N junction”). At the time hardly anyone knew anything about the impurities within these crystals, but Russell Ohl discovered the mechanism by which it worked.  It was the impurities which made some sections more resistant to electrical flow than others, and thus it was the "barrier" between these areas of different purity that made the crystal work. Ohl later found that super-purifying germanium was the key to making repeatable and usable semiconductor material for diodes. All diodes (incl. LEDs, laser diodes etc.) are descendants of Ohl's work. His work with diodes led him later to develop the first silicon solar cells.

See also
 Battery
 Solar cell
 Transistor

References

Further reading

 Crystal Fire: The Birth of the Information Age, by Michael Riordan and Lillian Hoddeson; Chapter 6 covers his discover of the P-N junction in some detail

External links
  -- "Light sensitive device"
 IEEE History Center: Oral History of Russell Ohl
 Oral history interview with Dr. Russell Ohl on 19 August 1976, American Institute of Physics, Niels Bohr Library & Archives - Session I, interview conducted by Lillian Hoddeson in Vista, California
 Oral history interview with Dr. Russell Ohl on 20 August 1976, American Institute of Physics, Niels Bohr Library & Archives - Session II
 Russell Ohl - Longer biography at the Engineering and Technology History Wiki 
 PBC Biography of Russell Ohl

1898 births
1987 deaths